Zemfira Ramazanovna Magomedalieva (born 8 February 1988) is a Russian boxer.

She won a medal at the 2019 AIBA Women's World Boxing Championships. She competed in the middleweight division at the 2020 Summer Olympics where she won a bronze medal.

Notes

References

1988 births
Living people
People from Tlyaratinsky District
Sportspeople from Dagestan
AIBA Women's World Boxing Championships medalists
Russian women boxers
Light-heavyweight boxers
World light-heavyweight boxing champions
Boxers at the 2020 Summer Olympics
Olympic boxers of Russia
Olympic medalists in boxing
Medalists at the 2020 Summer Olympics
Olympic bronze medalists for the Russian Olympic Committee athletes
20th-century Russian people
21st-century Russian people